The commune of Ryansoro is a commune of Gitega Province in central Burundi. The capital lies at Ryansoro.

References

Communes of Burundi
Gitega Province